The following outline is provided as an overview of and topical guide to Honduras:

Honduras – sovereign country located in Central America.  Honduras was formerly known as Spanish Honduras to differentiate it from British Honduras (now Belize). The country is bordered to the west by Guatemala, to the southwest by El Salvador, to the southeast by Nicaragua, to the south by the Pacific Ocean at the Gulf of Fonseca, and to the north by the Gulf of Honduras, a large inlet of the Caribbean Sea.

General reference

 Pronunciation: 
 Common English country name: Honduras
 Official English country name: The Republic of Honduras
 Common endonym(s):  
 Official endonym(s):  
 Adjectival: Honduran
 Demonym(s):
 Etymology: Name of Honduras
 International rankings of Honduras
 ISO country codes: HN, HND, 340
 ISO region codes: See ISO 3166-2:HN
 Internet country code top-level domain: .hn

Geography of Honduras 

Geography of Honduras
 Honduras is: a country
 Location:
 Northern Hemisphere and Western Hemisphere
 Americas
 North America
 Middle America
 Central America
 Time zone:  Central Standard Time (UTC-06)
 Extreme points of Honduras
 High:  Cerro Las Minas 
 Low:  Caribbean Sea and North Pacific Ocean 0 m
 Land boundaries:  1,520 km
 922 km
 342 km
 256 km
 Coastline:  820 km
 Population of Honduras: 7,106,000  - 97th most populous country

 Area of Honduras: 112,492 km2
 Atlas of Honduras

Environment of Honduras 

 Climate of Honduras
 Deforestation in Central America
 Renewable energy in Honduras
 Geology of Honduras
 Protected areas of Honduras
 Biosphere reserves in Honduras
 National parks of Honduras
 Wildlife of Honduras
 Fauna of Honduras
 Birds of Honduras
 Mammals of Honduras

Natural geographic features of Honduras 

 Fjords of Honduras
 Islands of Honduras
 Lakes of Honduras
 Mountains of Honduras
 Volcanoes in Honduras
 Rivers of Honduras
 Waterfalls of Honduras
 Valleys of Honduras
 World Heritage Sites in Honduras

Regions of Honduras 

Regions of Honduras

Ecoregions of Honduras 

List of ecoregions in Honduras

Administrative divisions of Honduras 

Administrative divisions of Honduras
 Departments of Honduras
 Municipalities of Honduras

Departments of Honduras 

Departments of Honduras

Municipalities of Honduras 

Municipalities of Honduras
 Cities of Honduras
 Capital of Honduras: Tegucigalpa

Demography of Honduras 

Demographics of Honduras

Government and politics of Honduras 

Politics of Honduras
 Form of government: presidential representative democratic republic
 Capital of Honduras: Tegucigalpa
 Elections in Honduras

 Political parties in Honduras

Branches of the government of Honduras 

Government of Honduras

Executive branch of the government of Honduras 
 Head of state and Head of government: President of Honduras, Juan Orlando Hernández
 Cabinet of Honduras

Legislative branch of the government of Honduras 

 National Congress of Honduras (unicameral)

Judicial branch of the government of Honduras 

 Supreme Court of Honduras

Foreign relations of Honduras 

Foreign relations of Honduras
 Diplomatic missions in Honduras
 Diplomatic missions of Honduras

International organization membership 

International organization membership of Honduras
The Republic of Honduras is a member of:

Agency for the Prohibition of Nuclear Weapons in Latin America and the Caribbean (OPANAL)
Central American Bank for Economic Integration (BCIE)
Central American Common Market (CACM)
Central American Integration System (SICA)
Food and Agriculture Organization (FAO)
Group of 77 (G77)
Inter-American Development Bank (IADB)
International Atomic Energy Agency (IAEA)
International Bank for Reconstruction and Development (IBRD)
International Civil Aviation Organization (ICAO)
International Criminal Court (ICCt)
International Criminal Police Organization (Interpol)
International Development Association (IDA)
International Federation of Red Cross and Red Crescent Societies (IFRCS)
International Finance Corporation (IFC)
International Fund for Agricultural Development (IFAD)
International Labour Organization (ILO)
International Maritime Organization (IMO)
International Monetary Fund (IMF)
International Olympic Committee (IOC)
International Organization for Migration (IOM)
International Organization for Standardization (ISO) (subscriber)
International Red Cross and Red Crescent Movement (ICRM)
International Telecommunication Union (ITU)
International Telecommunications Satellite Organization (ITSO)

International Trade Union Confederation (ITUC)
Latin American Economic System (LAES)
Latin American Integration Association (LAIA) (observer)
Multilateral Investment Guarantee Agency (MIGA)
Nonaligned Movement (NAM)
Organisation for the Prohibition of Chemical Weapons (OPCW)
Organization of American States (OAS)
Permanent Court of Arbitration (PCA)
Rio Group (RG)
Unión Latina
United Nations (UN)
United Nations Conference on Trade and Development (UNCTAD)
United Nations Educational, Scientific, and Cultural Organization (UNESCO)
United Nations Industrial Development Organization (UNIDO)
United Nations Mission for the Referendum in Western Sahara (MINURSO)
Universal Postal Union (UPU)
World Confederation of Labour (WCL)
World Customs Organization (WCO)
World Federation of Trade Unions (WFTU)
World Health Organization (WHO)
World Intellectual Property Organization (WIPO)
World Meteorological Organization (WMO)
World Tourism Organization (UNWTO)
World Trade Organization (WTO)

Law and order in Honduras 

Law of Honduras
 Capital punishment in Honduras
 Constitution of Honduras
 Crime in Honduras
 Human rights in Honduras
 LGBT rights in Honduras
 Freedom of religion in Honduras
 Law enforcement in Honduras

Military of Honduras 

Military of Honduras
 Command
 Commander-in-chief: Romeo Vásquez Velásquez
 Ministry of Defence of Honduras
Minister of Defence of Honduras: Angel Edmundo Orellana Mercado
 Forces
 Army of Honduras
 Honduran Navy
 Honduran Air Force
 Military history of Honduras
 Military ranks of Honduras

Local government in Honduras 

Departments of Honduras

History of Honduras 

History of Honduras
Timeline of the history of Honduras
Current events of Honduras
 Military history of Honduras

Culture of Honduras 

Culture of Honduras
 Architecture of Honduras
 Cuisine of Honduras
 Festivals in Honduras
 Languages of Honduras
 Media in Honduras
 National symbols of Honduras
 Coat of arms of Honduras
 Flag of Honduras
 National anthem of Honduras
 Hondurans
 Prostitution in Honduras
 Public holidays in Honduras
 Records of Honduras
 Religion in Honduras
 Buddhism in Honduras
 Christianity in Honduras
 Hinduism in Honduras
 Islam in Honduras
 Judaism in Honduras
 Sikhism in Honduras
 World Heritage Sites in Honduras

Art in Honduras 
 Art in Honduras
 Cinema of Honduras
 Literature of Honduras
 Music of Honduras
 Television in Honduras
 Theatre in Honduras

Sports in Honduras 

Sports in Honduras
 Football in Honduras
Honduras at the Olympics

Economy and infrastructure of Honduras 

Economy of Honduras
 Economic rank, by nominal GDP (2007): 107th (one hundred and seventh)
 Agriculture in Honduras
 Banking in Honduras
 National Bank of Honduras
 Communications in Honduras
 Internet in Honduras
 Companies of Honduras
Currency of Honduras: Lempira
ISO 4217: HNL
 Energy in Honduras
 Honduras Stock Exchange
 Transport in Honduras
 Airports in Honduras
 Rail transport in Honduras
 Tourism in Honduras
 Water supply and sanitation in Honduras

Education in Honduras 

Education in Honduras

See also 
 

Index of Honduras-related articles
List of Honduras-related topics

Outline of Central America
Outline of North America

References

External links

 Government of Honduras 
 Honduran Biodiversity Database
 
 
 Humanitarian Aid in Honduras

Honduras